The St. Louis Cardinals 2015 season was the 134th for the Major League Baseball (MLB) franchise in St. Louis, Missouri, the 124th season in the National League (NL), and the 10th at Busch Stadium III.  They entered the 2015 season as two-time defending NL Central division champions and having made four consecutive National League Championship Series (NLCS) appearances.

The Cardinals' 2014–15 offseason began tragically with the death of rookie outfielder Oscar Taveras in a traffic collision on October 26.  On November 17, they acquired right fielder Jason Heyward and pitcher Jordan Walden from the Atlanta Braves in a blockbuster trade for pitchers Shelby Miller and Tyrell Jenkins.  The Cardinals inducted Curt Flood, Bob Forsch, George Kissell and Ted Simmons into the franchise Hall of Fame.  Forbes valued the Cardinals at $1.2 billion in 2015, ranking them 27th out of all sports franchises in the world, and the sixth-highest in all MLB.

By winning 22 of their first 29 games of the season, the Cardinals secured their best start since 1887, and became the first major league team of the year to reach 50 wins, the fastest since the Chicago White Sox in 2005.  Outfielder Matt Holliday set a new National League record by reaching base in his first 45 games of the season.  In June, reports surfaced that the Federal Bureau of Investigation (FBI) were investigating an incident involving the Cardinals hacking into the Houston Astros' computer networks, the first known such case of corporate espionage in professional sports.

By winning their 100th game on September 30, the Cardinals clinched their third consecutive division title.  It was the first time since 2005 they had won at least 100 games in a season, and they became the first team to do so since the 2011 Phillies. However, they lost to the Chicago Cubs in the Division Series, ending their streak of four straight NLCS appearances.

Off-season

Overview
The St. Louis Cardinals ended their 2014 regular season as the National League Central division champions with a 90–72 won–loss record, their second consecutive Central division title and ninth overall. They finished sixth in the league in batting average (.253), fifteenth (last) in home runs (105), and ninth in runs scored (619).  They also ranked seventh in earned run average (3.50).

St. Louis finished two games ahead of the runner-up Pittsburgh Pirates, who qualified for the Wild Card Game. In the National League Division Series (NLDS), the Cardinals defeated the Los Angeles Dodgers, three games to one. They surrendered the National League Championship Series (NLCS) in five games to the San Francisco Giants, the eventual World Series champions. Despite the NLCS defeat, the Cardinals already had four consecutive LCS appearances, the first team to do so since the New York Yankees from 1998–2001 in the American League Championship Series.  Since 2000, it was their ninth NLCS appearance.

However, tragedy launched Major League Baseball's 2014–15 off-season when Cardinals rookie right fielder Oscar Taveras was killed in a car accident in the Dominican Republic on October 26, 2014.  It was 10 days after the conclusion of the NLCS, and moments before the first pitch of Game 5 of the World Series. Reports confirmed alcohol intoxication on Taveras' part, making it the second alcohol-related fatality of a Cardinals player in a car accident since pitcher Josh Hancock in 2007. General manager John Mozeliak lamented the circumstances of both players' deaths, amplifying that the team would take a greater role in instructing young players "to avoid reckless actions."

Just 22 years old, Taveras was an immensely popular athlete and heralded prospect with fans, around Major League Baseball, and in his native Dominican Republic. On October 28, the Cardinals left the right field lights on at Busch Stadium and released a Twitter photo of the scene the next day. The following January, Cardinals chairman William DeWitt, Jr., announced plans for the team to renovate a baseball field in Taveras' hometown of Sosúa in his honor, and that the team would also wear black circular patches inscribed with the initials "OT" inside a white circle on their jerseys for the 2015 season.  Further, a large decal was posted in his memorial on the wall of the home team bullpen of Busch Stadium along with those of Hancock and Darryl Kile, another pitcher who died during the 2002 season while still active as a player.

Bench coach Mike Aldrete vacated the Cardinals on October 27 for the same avocation with the Oakland Athletics. The day after the World Series ended, October 30, Mark Ellis, Justin Masterson, Jason Motte, Pat Neshek, and A. J. Pierzynski all filed for free agency. Four of the five players in the group signed with different teams in the 2014–15 off-season. Only Motte, a former closer, had played for the Cardinals prior to 2014.  He acceded a one-year contract with the Chicago Cubs. The only free agent who did not endorse with another club was Ellis, who announced his retirement as a player on February 26, 2015.

The Cardinals picked up the 2015 option on starting pitcher John Lackey's contract on October 30, equivalent to the minimum salary of $507,000 ($ today), an unusually low number on for a veteran of his achievement level and competitiveness. Acquired from the Boston Red Sox at the trade deadline in 2014, he signed his current contract as a free agent before the 2010 season.  The Red Sox inserted a provision in the contract that, in lieu of paying insurance in case he missed any season due to an elbow injury, the club could choose to pick up an option in 2015 for the league minimum salary.  At that time, the Red Sox medical staff demonstrated concern that Lackey's elbow was found not to be fully sound during a physical examination.  When he missed the 2012 season due to Tommy John surgery, the league-minimum option for 2015 was actuated. The Cardinals added performance bonuses before the start of the season.

The Houston Astros appointed longtime scout Charlie González as a special assistant on November 1. Two days later, the Cardinals signed assistant hitting coach David Bell to a two-year contract to replace Aldrete as bench coach. To fill the position Bell vacated, the Cardinals hired former Cubs hitting coach Bill Mueller as assistant hitting coach on November 17.

With a void in right field that emerged following the death of Taveras, the Cardinals settled a surprising blockbuster trade with the Atlanta Braves on November 17.  St. Louis arrogated former Baseball America Minor League Player of the Year Jason Heyward and relief pitcher Jordan Walden in exchange for starting pitcher Shelby Miller and reliever Tyrell Jenkins. For the second time in the 2014–15 off-season, the Athletics drew from the Cardinals' staff, hiring director of scouting Dan Kantrovitz to be assistant general manager on November 24. To replace Kantrovitz, director of baseball development Chris Correa was promoted to director of scouting on December 2. One week later, the Missouri Sports Hall of Fame announced former ace Chris Carpenter as an inductee in their 2015 class.

The Cardinals signed free agents relief pitcher Matt Belisle (December 2), from the Colorado Rockies, and first baseman Mark Reynolds (December 11) from the Milwaukee Brewers. They initially imported veteran reliever Carlos Villanueva on a minor league deal in February, but selected him for the major league roster out of spring training.

In March 2015, Forbes appraised the Cardinals' outright value at $1.4 billion, making them the 27th-most valuable sports franchise in the world, and sixth-principal franchise in Major League Baseball (MLB). It was an increase from an $800 million pricing and eighth in the echelon in 2014. Their revenue was $294 million while their operating income was $73.6 million, and their overall assessment was approximately $200 million higher than the MLB average of $1.2 billion.  Mike Ozanian of Forbes remarked that the Cardinals were "baseball's biggest anamoly", with outsize value outpacing their status as one of baseball's "smallest markets", and the recently opened Ballpark Village – adjacent to Busch Stadium – was a popular destination for dining and entertainment.  The Cardinals' local television ratings (7.76) graded the highest among all major league teams.

Acquisitions, departures and roster moves

Ownership, club officials, managers, and coaches

Players

Season standings

National League Central

National League playoff standings

National League head-to-head records

Regular season summary

April

First-ever MLB Opening Night
For the first time in his career, 23-year-old Carlos Martínez made the Cardinals starting rotation, earning the fifth starter spot out of spring training. Participating in the first-ever night game Opening Day to commence an MLB season, the Cardinals faced off against the Chicago Cubs on April 5, partners in an historic sports rivalry.  Also dubbed "Opening Night", Adam Wainwright made his fourth career Opening Day start.  St. Louis, in turn, made team history as they won 3–0. Their four stolen bases (SB) set a team record for Opening Day, and Yadier Molina became the first catcher in club history with 11 consecutive Opening Day starts. Right fielder Jason Heyward debuted for the Cardinals in this game, garnering three hits, including two doubles, and a stolen base. Left fielder Matt Holliday opened the season with a 12-game hitting streak.  His 12th game was also his first four-hit performance of the season.

Matt Carpenter's doubles in seven consecutive games
From April 12–19, third baseman Matt Carpenter netted seven consecutive games with at least two hits and one double, tying Ripper Collins for the franchise record he set in 1935. That same streak was also the longest in the Major Leagues since Paul Molitor achieve the same as a member of the Brewers in 1991.  Carpenter also batted .480 with an .880 slugging percentage (SLG), seven doubles, one home run (HR), five runs batted in (RBI) and an-NL leading 22 total bases.  MLB subsequently named him to his first NL Player of the Week Award for that period.

Making his 99th career start on April 15, starter Lance Lynn earned his 50th career win in a 4–2 victory over Milwaukee.  It was his 13th win in the month of April since 2012, the highest total in MLB. Setup man Kevin Siegrist earned his first major league save by pitching the last two innings of a 6−1 win against the Reds on April 17. Heyward hit his first home run as a Cardinal on April 18 against the Cincinnati Reds at Busch Stadium.

Harris first Naval Academy graduate in MLB in 94 years, Wainwright out for season
The club placed OF Peter Bourjos on three-day paternity leave on April 21, replacing him on the 25-man roster with RHP Mitch Harris.  Harris was the first United States Naval Academy graduate to be called up to the majors since pitcher Nemo Gaines of the Washington Senators in 1921. On April 25, Harris made his major-league debut, substituting for Wainwright in a game against Milwaukee after he suffered an ankle injury, and struck out his first batter, Adam Lind.  Catcher Cody Stanley, who replaced Wainwright on the 25-man roster, got a hit in his first major league at bat. The Cardinals announced that Wainwright had an Achilles tendon rupture and would likely miss the remainder of the season.

Left-handed pitcher (LHP) Tim Cooney took Wainwright's next spot in the rotation. It was his major league debut, but was a disappointment, going only  innings and giving up seven hits and a walk.  The following day, the Cardinals called up RHP Miguel Socolovich and sent down Cooney. To make room on the 40-man roster, OF Tommy Pham was moved to the 60-day disabled list.  Through his first four starts of the season, Martínez' ERA was 1.89. Through the month of April, Holliday maintained an MLB-best .500 OBP.

May

Sweep of each game of home series with walk-off hits
The month of May increased the trend of unique and rare achievements for the Cardinals, both affirmative and dubious.  In the May 1–3 series at home against the Pittsburgh Pirates, the Cardinals swept by winning each game in extra innings.  In the last game of that series, Kolten Wong hit his second career regular-season walk-off home run; his first also occurred against the Pirates.  St. Louis became the first team since 1925 to sweep by winning each game in extra innings when the Cincinnati Reds did so against the Boston Braves from June 4–7. Of course, because the games were at Busch Stadium, St. Louis each won in walk-off fashion: first baseman Matt Adams with a bases-loaded single in the first game, and Carpenter with a sacrifice fly in the second.

Best 25-game start since at least 1900
Miguel Socolovich made his Cardinals debut on May 3 against the Reds, completing one inning with a strikeout and no hits or walks. Setup man Jordan Walden went on the DL on May 3 because of a biceps injury, and it changed manager Mike Matheny's bullpen strategy by using his most capable relief pitchers more, including closer Trevor Rosenthal, setup man Matt Belisle and middle reliever Seth Maness.  Each were either injured or because less effective later in the season. Kevin Siegrist, who originally filled the seventh inning, moved to the eight-inning setup role, leaving a hollow in the seventh inning.

The Cardinals defeated the Cubs on May 4 for their seventh straight win, making their record on the season an MLB-best 19–6.  It was their best start after 25 games since at least 1900. In that contest, Mark Reynolds hit his fourth career grand slam in the 10–9 score. Despite getting a no-decision, Martínez allowed seven of the nine runs in this game. In the next game, also against the Cubs, Reynolds' pinch-hit double drove in the go-ahead runs as the Cardinals were victorious, 7–4.

The Cardinals called LHP Tyler Lyons up from Memphis to take Wainwright's next turn in the rotation on May 5.  Lyons completed  innings with seven strikeouts, two walks, six hits, and four runs (three earned).  In  IP against the Cubs on May 7, RHP John Lackey struck out 10.  He also drove in his third career run with a double, his third career extra base hit in a 5–1 win.

Flood, Forsch, Kissell and Simmons announced as new Cardinals Hall of Fame inductees
Four new members of the St. Louis Cardinals Hall of Fame Museum were announced on May 5, including Curt Flood, Bob Forsch, George Kissell and Ted Simmons.  In 12 seasons with St. Louis, center fielder Flood won seven Gold Gloves, was a three-time All-Star, and a member of the 1964 and 1967 championship clubs.  However, Flood is best known for challenging the reserve clause, which in spite of the United States Supreme Court ruling in MLB's favor, eventually led to free agency.  Forsch, the only pitcher in franchise history to throw two no-hitters, ranked third with 163 wins and second with 401 starts.  Kissell spent 65 years in the Cardinals organization as a minor league player, manager, scout and instructor.  Simmons, a catcher, played 13 years in St. Louis, was a six-time All-Star, and set the National League record for hits (188) by a catcher in 1975.  He batted .298 with 172 HR and 929 RBI as Cardinal.

Molina hit into first-ever 4–5–4 triple play in MLB
In the next series against the Pirates on May 9, Martínez continued to struggle as he allowed 14 runs on 16 hits and 11 walks including the previous two starts totaling nine innings.  His ERA jumped from 1.89 from before the previous start against the Cubs to 4.73 after the start against the Pirates. The next day, the Cardinals fell victim to the first "4–5–4" triple play (where the second baseman records the out, throws to the third baseman, who records a second out, and finally back to the second baseman, who records a third and final out of the inning, all in one play) in MLB history.  In this play, Molina lined out to Pittsburgh second baseman Neil Walker, who threw to third baseman Jung-ho Kang to double up Jhonny Peralta for the second out.  Kang briefly pirouetted the ball in his hand, albeit confused, then threw back to Walker to tag Jason Heyward for the final out.

Cardinals batters struck out record 18 times
Reigning American League Cy Young Award winner Corey Kluber of the Cleveland Indians struck out 18 Cardinals on May 13, setting a record for a Cardinal opponent and tying Bob Feller for the Indians' nine-inning franchise record in Cleveland's 2–0 win. After striking out five times on May 18, Grichuk followed up with two doubles and a triple the next night against the New York Mets as the Cardinals prevailed 10–2. A 3–1 victory over the Detroit Tigers on May 17 gave Mike Matheny his 300th win as manager. Jaime García, reactivated from the 60-day disabled list for a start against the Mets on May 21, made his first MLB appearance in nearly one year.  He completed seven innings but received the loss, allowing five hits, two runs (both earned), five walks, and striking out three.

The Cardinals won each of Michael Wacha's first nine starts while he received the win in seven of them.  That ninth game spanned through May 24 against the Kansas City Royals.  His ERA was 1.87.  Wacha was the first Cardinal pitcher to start with a 7–0 record since Matt Morris started 8–0 in 2005. Matt Carpenter homered for his 500th career hit and 300th career run scored. On May 25, Jhonny Peralta hit a walk-off home run in the tenth inning against the Arizona Diamondbacks, his seventh home run of the season. García's first win in nearly a year was on May 26 against the Diamondbacks, in which worked six innings in a 6–4 victory.

Matt Holliday's record on-base streak
Holliday reached base each of his first 43 games of the season through May 27 against the Diamondbacks, breaking Albert Pujols' franchise and National League records, which he set in 2008.  Holliday had also reached base in 45 consecutive games dating back to 2014, which was 10 short of Stan Musial's overall franchise record, and 29 short of Ted Williams' MLB record. Heyward's home run in the ninth inning that game tied the game at 3–3, and the Cardinals eventually won, 4–3. IF Matt Adams was placed on the 15-day disabled list May 28 with a torn right quadriceps and replaced on the 25-man roster with C Ed Easley.  He had surgery May 29 and was expected to miss three to four months, effectively the rest of the season.

Tribute to Taveras
On May 31, the Cardinals paid an official tribute to the deceased Oscar Taveras, who debuted for them in the major leagues exactly one year earlier.  They played the Los Angeles Dodgers that day.  Martínez, the Cardinals starting pitcher and close of friend of Taveras, struck out eight and extended a personal scoreless inning streak to  innings as St. Louis prevailed, 3–1. It was the longest scoreless-inning streak in the NL for a starting pitcher through that point in the season.

Through their first 50 games and two of the months of the season, the Cardinals were an MLB-best 33–17 (.660 winning percentage), including 20–6 at home.  They produced the best run differential at plus-60 and were the only team with a staff ERA lower than 3.00, at 2.73. The bullpen had a 2.21 ERA.  The offense produced a seventh-best .737 on-base plus slugging percentage (OPS).

June

In his third start of the season on June 1 against the Milwaukee Brewers, García logged seven innings, while allowing one run and striking out four with less than 90 pitches.  However, he ended up with a 1–0 loss, bringing his record for the season to 1–2 with a 2.70 ERA. In his time with the Cardinals through June 1, Peralta ranked first in extra-base hits (80) and home runs (29), third in RBI (101), second in slugging percentage (.461) and OPS (.804) and fourth in on-base percentage (.361) among MLB shortstops.  On defense, although he did not rely on heavily on range, but on smart positioning and making the routine plays, qualifying him for +1 defensive runs saved after saving 17 the year before. Holliday's National League-record on-base streak to start the season ended at 45 games – 47 overall – on June 2 against the Brewers in a 1–0 win. Umpire Joe West ejected him for arguing a called third strike in the seventh inning, and also ejected manager Mike Matheny, who had joined the argument. It was the longest such streak in the major leagues since Derek Jeter garnered 53 in 1999.

Holliday, the second Cardinal of the season with a torn quadriceps muscle
Martínez' next start, also against the Dodgers, came on June 5. Over seven innings, he gave up just one run on three hits and struck out 11, a new career high, in a 2–1 victory. On June 8, Holliday suffered a right quadriceps strain while attempting to catch a fly ball off the bat of Carlos González during a game against the Colorado Rockies. The Cardinals placed Holliday on the 15-day DL, and recalled Socolovich to take his place on the roster. At the time, Holliday was batting .303 with three HR and 26 RBI, and was third overall in the NL All-Star balloting. He was second among outfielders to Bryce Harper of the Washington Nationals, which would translate as a spot as a starting outfielder in the All-Star Game if that placement held for the final vote tally. In the MLB Draft, the Cardinals selected outfielder Nick Plummer with the 23rd overall and team's number-one pick from Brother Rice High School in Michigan. In a June 12 start against the Royals, Jaime García netted his 500th career strikeout by getting Omar Infante as the Cardinals won 4–0. It was García's 102nd career start; he had also not issued a walk in his first 30 IP of the season.

Lyons, whom the Cardinals recalled from Memphis to take the place of an injured Lance Lynn on June 13, stopped a winless streak of 13 MLB starts by pitching a 3–2 victory over the Royals.  He struck out five in six innings. Closer Trevor Rosenthal strung together a  scoreless inning streak while saving his NL-leading 21st game of the season. The Cardinals' first back-to-back home runs of the season occurred on June 15 against the Twins, which Molina and Reynolds accomplished.  It was Molina's first home run of the season and first in 95 games, dating back to June 27, 2014.  The Cardinals' previous back-to-back home runs occurred when Holliday and Grichuk delivered against the Reds on September 19, 2014.

First alleged case of cyber espionage in professional sports
Reports surfaced on June 16 that the Federal Bureau of Investigation (FBI) were reviewing an alleged incident involving Cardinals' front office officials hacking into the Houston Astros' database of players, scouting reports and proprietary statistics.  It was regarded as the first known case of corporate espionage involving computer network hacking in professional sports.

Rookies Grichuk, Garcia and Scruggs help deliver wins
In his first major league action of 2015, second baseman Greg Garcia collected two hits in 12–4 win over the Philadelphia Phillies on June 19. Molina, Wong and Grichuk all homered as Lyons earned his second win of the season.  At the plate, Lyons collected both his first major league run batted in and base on balls and while hitting two singles.  He reached base and scored in all three plate appearances. Garcia and IF Xavier Scruggs had been called up from Memphis on June 19 in preparation for the series against the Phillies, with Harris and Easley optioned back to the AAA club. The Cardinals were also victorious the next game by a 10–1 score.  Grichuk followed with a two more home runs and his second consecutive three-hit game.  Heyward also contributed three hits and two RBI.  Lackey, the Cardinals' starting pitcher, completed seven innings, for the fourth time in five starts.  He improved his record to 6–4 with a 3.41 ERA.

Scruggs provided three hits and two RBI, Heyward hit his eighth home run, and Reynolds drove in the go-ahead run with a bases-loaded infield single on June 23 against the Miami Marlins in a 4–3 win. The Cardinals activated Lynn from the DL the next day prior to the series finale against the Marlins. Heyward homered again the next game, and Wong hit his ninth HR as García improved to 3–3 in a 6–1 victory and series win over the Marlins. The Cardinals optioned Lyons back to Memphis to make room on the roster for Lynn, who started the next game against the Marlins, pitching six scoreless innings in a 5–1 victory and series sweep.  Wong's RBI double broke a scoreless tie and put the Cardinals ahead for good. Pete Kozma, filling in for Peralta at shortstop, scored on that double had three hits and reached base in four plate appearances, snapping an 0–21 streak that dated back to May 19.

Greg Garcia's first major league home was on June 26 in the eighth inning against Pedro Strop of the Cubs, tying the score in an eventual 4–3 Cardinals win, where they walked off when Bourjos scored on an error in the 10th inning.  The Cardinals improved to an MLB-best 27–7 at home.

Best start in MLB in ten years
The Cardinals won their fifth straight game on June 27 by a score of 8–1, also at home against the Cubs, extending their major league-best record to 50–24.  Scruggs provided another three-hit night as all nine starters collected at least one hit.  Wacha improved to 10–3 and Carlos Villanueva pitched the last three innings for his first save of the season and fourth career with three or more innings pitched.  Each of the second, third and fourth innings with the Cubs batting ended with a double play.

The Cardinals became the first club of the season to reach 50 wins and the fastest to win 50 since the Chicago White Sox in 2005.  In the last 50 years, the 2015 Cardinals were just the 18th club to reach 50 wins before losing their 25th game, of which, 13 went on to win 100 or more games and only two missed the playoffs.  The only other time in Cardinals' history with such a start or better occurred in 1944 (52–21–2), a season that concluded with 105 regular-season wins and the World Series title.  The 2015 club held the major leagues' best run-differential at +95, and their staff ERA (2.63) was the lowest through 74 games in a season since the Baltimore Orioles in 1972 (2.31).

Wacha and Martínez both with nine wins before July
Winning again against the Cubs on June 28, the Cardinals swept as Martínez won his ninth decision.  Thus he and Wacha were the first teammate duo aged 23 and under to win nine games or more in their team's first 75 since Dwight Gooden and Sid Fernandez did so with the Mets in 1986. On June 30 against the Chicago White Sox, the Cardinals again fell victim to a strikeout record against an American League Central pitcher.  By striking out 12 Cardinals hitters, Chris Sale matched Pedro Martínez with 10 or more strikeouts in each of eight consecutive games, which Martínez accomplished in 1999.  The Cardinals fell to the White Sox, 2–1, in extra innings for just their second loss at home of the month.  Grichuk hit a  home run off Sale into the Big Mac Land section, the longest home run of the year at Busch Stadium by a Cardinals player through that point.  The bullpen finished with an MLB-best 1.52 ERA for the month of June.

July

Dismissal of Correa for unauthorized access
On July 2, news reports including those by the St. Louis Post-Dispatch indicated that the Cardinals had dismissed scouting director Chris Correa after he had admitted to illegally accessing the Astros' scouting database in 2013.

On January 8, 2016, Correa pleaded guilty in federal court to five counts of unauthorized access to a protected computer from at least March 2013 through June 2014. Officials in MLB's commissioner's office said they will review the results of the federal investigation and determine if and when any penalties will be assessed against the Cardinals.

End of Rosenthal's scoreless streak
Trevor Rosenthal's  IP scoreless streak ended on July 3 against the San Diego Padres. Jedd Gyorko singled home the go-ahead run in the ninth to send the Cardinals to their fourth consecutive loss.  Rosenthal's streak, which dated back to May 5, was the longest among relief pitchers in the National League to that point in the season. The Cardinals recalled Harris and optioned Greg Garcia back to Memphis on July 4.

Pham's first MLB double and home run help win two games
On July 4, the Cardinals defeated the Padres 2–1 as center fielder Tommy Pham, just recalled from Memphis, was influential in helping snap the four-game losing streak.  He doubled for his first major league hit, then, later in the game, pilfered his first stolen base and scored the winning run. The next game, Pham hit his first major league home run and drove in his first major league runs, driving in all three runs in a 3–1 victory and propelling the Cardinals to the series split with the Padres. The Cardinals placed Jaime García with a right groin strain and recalled Cooney from Memphis.  García sustained the injury on June 24 while running the bases against Miami.

Six selected for All-Star Game

Six Cardinals were selected to compete for the National League All-Star team in the 86th All-Star Game at Great American Ball Park in Cincinnati, including Matt Holliday, Carlos Martínez, Yadier Molina, Jhonny Peralta, Trevor Rosenthal and Michael Wacha.  Peralta and Holliday were voted to start the game by fan vote on July 6.  Peralta garnered the most votes among NL shortstops, while Holliday placed third among NL outfielders, which automatically assured him one three starting outfield spots.  Molina and Rosenthal were selected by fellow players on July 7; NL manager Bruce Bochy also selected Wacha that day.  Additionally, Martínez was nominated as a contender for the All-Star Final Vote, which he won on July 10 for was his first All-Star selection.

Although it was Holliday's seventh All-Star selection, it was first time he was selected by fan vote, and thus, as a starter. He was held out of participating due to the quadriceps injury. Peralta made his third All-Star team and first playing for the National League.  Molina was selected for his seventh appearance, and Rosenthal and Wacha were both selected for the first time. Through July 10, Martínez completed  innings and notched a 10–3 record with a 2.52 ERA.  Over his previous 10 outings, his totals included 10 consecutive quality starts with a 1.20 ERA and 7–1 W–L. Rosenthal elected not to play due to a sore arm.

In the Reds' clubhouse for the All-Star Game, Molina was assigned the locker of second baseman Brandon Phillips.  A rift had developed between the two in 2010 when Phillips called the Cardinals a derogatory name to the press, and an altercation between them during one of Phillips' at bats the following game ignited a bench-clearing brawl.  Since then, the two mended their schism, and Molina has a photograph of their two families together. When informed with whom he shared, Molina replied, "This is Phillips' locker?  How about that?  I'll have to write something to him."

While the pregame roster introductions were made, Reds fans booed all six Cardinals players, and even former Cardinal Albert Pujols.  When Molina was introduced, the booing reached a crescendo, and he smiled and turned and pointed his thumbs toward the back of his jersey.  Pujols provided levity when he then joined in the booing.  After the game, Molina remarked to reporters, "when you spend 12 years coming to Cincinnati and you beat them so many times, they're going to boo you."  In his career to that point, he hit .319 with a .352 on-base percentage and .500 slugging percentage in 270 career at-bats at Great American Ball Park.

Pirates' three straight wins over Cardinals to end first half
In the morning of July 12, the Cardinals dropped their second straight game (that had started the night before) to the second place Pirates, after Andrew McCutchen hit a walk off home run off Nick Greenwood in the bottom of the 14th inning.  Earlier in this game, Mark Reynolds hit his first multiple home run game of the season – and 22nd of his career – while John Lackey delivered his sixth straight quality start, and 12th in 15 outings. The next game ended with a 6–5 extra-inning defeat of the Cardinals, this time in the bottom of the tenth inning.  The loss shrunk the Central division-leading Cardinals' lead over the Pirates to  games; it was also the Pirates' third consecutive victory over the Cardinals in as many days. Gregory Polanco's bases loaded single in the bottom of the tenth off Rosenthal gave the Pirates the win. Rosenthal's first blown save since May 3, it stopped a streak of 18 consecutive conversions. This match was the tenth meeting between the two clubs to this point in the season, of which they had split evenly, and the fifth to go into extra innings.

Despite withstanding both a three-game and four-game losing streak within their previous 14 games, the Cardinals entered the All-Star break with the best record in the major leagues at 56–33.  According to STATS LLC, St. Louis abdicated a 2.71 ERA, the leading at-the-break ERA in the majors since the 1981 Astros allowed a 2.81 ERA.  Between Lackey, Lynn, Martínez, and Wacha – the four with the most starts – their unified ERA was 2.84, the top figure for the club since 1968, the season of Bob Gibson's 1.12 ERA.  Their record at Busch Stadium was 31–11 for a .738 winning percentage, the highest in the major leagues.  They also had a 2.31 ERA at home.

Start of second half
On July 18, the Cardinals defeated the Mets 12–2 behind Lackey's seven innings and one run performance, Heyward's five hits and Grichuk's six RBI.  Through his previous seven starts, Lackey's ERA was 1.63.  Grichuk also had two home runs in the game, and a seven-game hitting streak, with 13 hits in 25 at bats (.520).  It was his first six-RBI game.  Heyward's five hits were his first in a game in two years. In the last game of the series, the Mets defeated the Cardinals 3–1 in 18 innings, in spite of stranding 25 runners, which tied their franchise record set in 1974.  The game lasted five hours and 55 minutes.

Matt Holliday's first home run in his return from the disabled list was a grand slam against Carlos Rodon of the Chicago White Sox in an 8–5 win on July 21. It was his sixth career grand slam. Stephen Piscotty, appearing in his first major league game, singled in his second at bat for his first MLB hit. In the next game, also against the White Sox, Piscotty hit his first career double.  With the bases loaded, Molina hit his first triple since 2011 and in more than 2,000 at bats.  This triple provided the decisive run in a 3–2 outcome and made the Cardinals the first team of the season to 60 wins.

Cooney earned his first major league win by pitching a career-high seven innings in a 4−2 win over the Atlanta Braves on July 24.  He had previously received no-decisions in each of his first five major league starts.  Further, Cooney had a 12-inning scoreless streak that ended in the sixth inning.  Grichuk hit a two-run home run, and, setup man Kevin Siegrist, filling in for closer Trevor Rosenthal, recorded his fifth save of the season. On July 25, Martínez pitched his 11th consecutive quality start, tying him with Clayton Kershaw of the Dodgers for longest current  streak, and the longest for the Cardinals since Chris Carpenter in 2010. Piscotty's sacrifice fly scored Kozma and was the only run of the game, giving the Cardinals a 1–0 win.  It was Piscotty's first MLB RBI.

Kolten Wong's second career grand slam provided the margin in a 4–1 win over the Reds on July 27. The Reds then shut out the Cardinals on consecutive days.  Holliday reaggravated the quadriceps injury on July 29 that he had sustained the month prior, and was placed on the 15-day DL. Lackey gave up just one run with eight strikeouts while allowing one walk and two hits.  It was the fewest hits he allowed through that point in the season.  He also allowed three runs or fewer in all but of one of his prior 17 starts.

However, the Cardinals' offense returned the following night (July 30) in a 9–8 home victory over the Colorado Rockies.  After slumping to a .216 batting average over three months since being moved down in the order, Matt Carpenter returned to the lead off position for his first career multi-home run game.  He also had four hits, four runs scored and four RBI.  The game involved multiple lead changes, poor fundamental play and angry exchanges between the two clubs.  Starting pitcher Carlos Martínez hit DJ LeMahieu with a pitch in the fifth inning; when the inning was completed, Martínez flashed an obscene gesture on full public display toward the visitors' dugout with Rockies players and personnel.  Corresponding aggressive verbal exchanges ensued, including those between Molina and Nolan Arenado.  In the seventh inning, Rockies pitcher Christian Friedrich hit Kolten Wong.  The umpires issued warnings in the fifth inning but no ejections followed.  Kevin Siegrist committed two throwing errors in the eighth inning involving Rockies baserunners, that, along with Randal Grichuk's throwing mistakes from center field (not officially ruled as errors), allowed Colorado to take an 8–6 lead.  The Cardinals came back in the bottom of the ninth, winning on Greg Garcia's bases loaded walk-off walk.  Carpenter was again instrumental, starting the rally with a ground rule double. Jhonny Peralta later delivered a game-tying two-run single before the Cardinals loaded the bases and Garcia drew the decisive walk.  Martínez' streak of 11 quality starts ended with this game after allowing five runs in five innings.

Non-waiver trade deadline acquisitions

To help offset the loss of batting production from Holliday's return to the DL, the Cardinals acquired first baseman and outfielder Brandon Moss from the Indians for LHP Rob Kaminsky. The following day, the Cardinals acquired another former closer in Jonathan Broxton, who was Milwaukee's setup man.  The Brewers also sent cash, as the pitcher's 2015 salary was $9 million ($ today), and he would have been arbitration eligible in 2016 with a $2 million ($ today) buyout.  The Cardinals sent outfielder Malik Collymore (minors, not on 40-man roster) to the Brewers.

On July 30, it was announced the Cardinals had agreed to a new television deal with Fox Sports Midwest.  It was an extension of the current deal, which would expire at the end of the 2017 season.  The new deal would extend through 2032 and be worth $1 billion overall.  It also guaranteed the franchise a minority stake in the network.  The Cardinals' current deal would have been worth about $35 million in its final year, then climb to roughly $55 million in 2018, increasing with inflation each year afterward.

August
Moss' first RBI for St. Louis occurred on August 2, a game-winning single that scored Jason Heyward in the bottom of the ninth inning against the Rockies. Carpenter hit five home runs from July 30 to August 5. On August 5 against the Reds at Great American Ball Park, Grichuk doubled in the sixth inning and hit the game-winning home run in the top of the 13th for a 4–3 win. After closing out a 6–0 contest against Milwaukee on August 7 with three scoreless innings, Carlos Villanueva earned his second save of the season, and second of three innings. By shutting out the Brewers 3–0 on August 8, Cardinals pitchers induced 36 consecutive scoreless innings.  Jaime García was the starter and winning pitcher in this game, improving to 4–4. The Cardinals extended their season-high scoreless streak to 38 innings against the Brewers on August 9, but lost the contest 5–4.  They had also completed 62 innings without allowing a home run, which also ended in this game.

Due to his increased frequency of home runs, Carpenter received consideration for a second NL Player of the week Award for August 9.  He batted .348 with four home runs, eight RBI, seven runs scored, a 1.000 SLG and .423 OBP.  Baseball America released their annual Tool Box Awards for 2015 on August 12, rated by managers and coaches league-wide.  Those rating at or near the top of various categories included Carpenter for "best strike zone judgment" (third), Yadier Molina for both "best hit and run artist" (tied for first) and "best defensive catcher" (first), Trevor Rosenthal for "best reliever" (third), and Mike Matheny for "best manager" (second).

In a 10–5 loss to the Pirates on August 13, starter Lance Lynn recorded just two outs while allowing seven runs total, three earned, in the first inning.  Lynn allowed six hits while throwing 41 pitches.  The Pirates scored four unearned runs after Matt Carpenter's throwing error.   Pedro Álvarez, with six hits in 12 at bats, two home runs, and two doubles in the series, also homered in the first inning. That gave him 18 home runs in 80 games against the Cardinals.  Lynn became the first Cardinals starter since Anthony Reyes on October 1, 2006, to fail to complete the first inning by reason other than injury. Tyler Lyons, making his first relief appearance of the season, took over for Lynn and completed  scoreless innings.  It was the Cardinals' first scoreless relief outing of at least five innings since Manny Aybar did so in 1999.

Jaime García pitched  innings against the Miami Marlins at Busch Stadium on August 14 in a 3–1 win.  One of the hits he allowed was to Ichiro Suzuki, his 4,191st hit in top-level professional baseball, matching Ty Cobb. Ichiro passed Cobb the next night with two singles as the Cardinals won, 6–2. John Lackey (10–7) was the Cardinals' starter and recorded his 12th consecutive season with at least 10 victories.  In  IP, he struck out six, and allowed the two runs after nine hits and one walk.  At one point, he retired nine consecutive batters. Randal Grichuk and Mark Reynolds both homered and Stephen Piscotty collected three hits. Piscotty then hit a home run in the next game, also against the Marlins, for his in the major leagues, and Jason Heyward homered twice for his first multi-home run game with the Cardinals.  It was not enough run support as Miami won, 6–4.

After injuring his right elbow, the Cardinals placed Grichuk on the DL on August 17 due to a strain, and recalled Tommy Pham in his place. With his first major league triple, Piscotty set up the go-ahead run in a 2–1 win over the San Francisco Giants on August 17. Molina's 100th career home run on August 19 was well-timed, becoming the game-winning run in the bottom of the eighth inning at Busch Stadium in a 4–3 win over the Giants.

The Cardinals won seven of ten games on their West Coast road trip from August 21–30.  After losing the first two games of the series against the San Diego Padres at Petco Park by a combined 17–3 score, the Cardinals won on August 23, 10–3.  Piscotty set a new career high with five RBI, and his first multi-home run game. Michael Wacha won his 15th game.

The Cardinals swept the Arizona Diamondbacks in four games at Chase Field August 24–27. After saving his 40th game on August 26, Rosenthal became the third-youngest MLB pitcher to record back-to-back 40 save seasons, and just the second Cardinals pitcher to do so. Lee Smith registered 40 saves each season from 1991–93. In the final game of the series against the Diamondbacks, Brandon Moss hit his first home run as a Cardinal, and Tony Cruz hit his first home run of the season in a 5–3 win. The Cardinals announced on August 28 that they had chosen Randy Flores, a former relief pitcher who had played for the Cardinals' 2006 World Series championship team, as their next director of scouting. Matt Carpenter reached 20 home runs for the first time in his career on August 30 in a 7–5 win over the Giants. Reynolds and Moss also homered, and Heyward singled, doubled, and tripled, and Siegrist got his sixth save.  It was the final game of the West Coast road trip.

September and October

St. Louis won their second successive, 8–5, come-from-behind victory at Busch Stadium over the Washington Nationals on September 1. Brandon Moss provided a three-run, walk-off home run. Marco Gonzales made his first appearance of the season in this game, allowing four runs in less than three innings. This win placed the club at 40 games above .500 for the first time on the season. The club activated center fielder Jon Jay from the disabled list on September 4 after missing 57 games due to a wrist injury. Jaime García achieved his 50th career win in a 4–1 decision over the Pirates on September 5, also reaching 100 IP in a season for the first time since 2012.

The Cardinals reactivated Grichuk on September 6.  Four days later, he played center field against the Cubs, but was not permitted to throw as his elbow had still not fully recovered. In an eight-game stretch, the Cardinals allowed 52 runs (6.5 per game), while scoring just 20, including a loss of 9–0 to the Cubs and another loss of 11–0 to the Reds.  First baseman Matt Adams, on the DL since late May, returned to play on September 11. On September 12, MLB announced an 80-game suspension of catcher Cody Stanley after testing positive for 4-Chlorodehydromethyltestosterone, a prohibited substance under their drug policy. The club activated reliever Matt Belisle from the DL on September 12, and reactivated Matt Holliday three days later after missing 41 games.

The Cardinals swept the September 15–17 series against Milwaukee to give them their first four-game winning streak of the month.  On September 16, Pham tripled and hit his first multi-home run game in a 5–4 victory.  He actually homered in three consecutive plate appearances spanning his last at bat previous to the game, September 13 against Cincinnati. In the next game, Pham's line drive ricocheted off the head of starting pitcher Jimmy Nelson.  Although Nelson had to leave the game, he was able to walk off the field in his own ability, and a magnetic resonance image (MRI) revealed a contusion.  The Cardinals won, 6–3.  Pham doubled and tripled in this game, giving him six hits and eight RBI in consecutive games against Milwaukee. With seven scoreless innings, Lackey reached 200 IP for the sixth time in his career and first time since 2010.  He had a 2.23 ERA over his last 17 starts. By reaching 200 IP, he triggered a $400,000 bonus, bringing his earnings for the season over $2 million.

With the Cubs seven games back, the first-place Cardinals visited Wrigley Field on September 18 to start a three-game series, continuing a renewed Cardinals–Cubs rivalry with Chicago being more competitive than in recent years.  After Cubs pitcher Dan Haren hit Matt Holliday in the back of the head in the fifth inning, Belisle grazed Anthony Rizzo behind the knee in the seventh inning, prompting his ejection.  The Cubs won, 8–3.  Remarked Cubs manager Joe Maddon about Belisle hitting Rizzo, "I have no history with the Cardinals except I used to love them growing up.  That really showed me a lot today in a negative way.  I don't know who put out the hit.  I don't know if Tony Soprano is in the dugout.  I didn't see him in there.  But we're not going to put up with it, from them or anybody else."

Chicago defeated St. Louis again the next game, 5–4, but the Cardinals clinched at least a spot in the wild-card play-in game with the Giants' loss to the Diamondbacks, the first team of the season to advance to the playoffs.  Matheny became the first manager in MLB history to guide his club to the postseason in each of his first four full seasons. In the third game of the series against the Cubs on September 20, the bases were loaded with no outs in the eight inning. Addison Russell hit a fly ball that Heyward caught running and threw home to Molina to tag out Rizzo by two steps, helping preserve a 4–3 win.  However, Molina injured his left thumb as he applied the tag. An MRI revealed a partial ligament tear the following day.  The same day, the Cardinals announced Adam Wainwright was cleared to resume baseball activities ahead of schedule after diligently rehabilitating his Achilles tendon rupture throughout the season. Pham drove in two of the runs in a 3–1 win over the Reds on September 22.

Catcher Travis Tartamella debuted on September 23 in the eighth inning of a 10–2 win against the Reds and singled on the first pitch of his first plate appearance. Martinez' season ended early in a start against the Brewers on September 25 in which threw only seven pitches; he also missed the postseason.  The injury was a shoulder strain; however, surgery was not deemed necessary and that he would recover in time for the 2016 season. While playing the Pirates on September 28, Piscotty was injured on a fly ball into left field when he collided with Bourjos' knee, which hit him in the head.  He suffered a bruise, but tests results were negative for injury, including concussion. The Cardinals won the contest 3–0, and Rosenthal gained his 48th save, establishing a new single-season franchise record.

Making his first appearance of the season since April, Wainwright pitched an inning of relief in the first game of a doubleheader against Pittsburgh on September 30, an 8–2 loss.  He gave up one run on two hits with a strikeout and no walks. He had returned from injury at least four months ahead of schedule. In the second game, the Cardinals won their 100th game of the season while clinching their third consecutive National League Central division title by an 11–1 score.  The Pirates, who had kept close with the Cardinals for nearly the entire season, had won their 96th game of the season earlier in the day.  They already qualified as one of two wild card entrants, along with the Cubs.  Heyward hit a grand slam to highlight the second game, the second of his career, and robbed both Francisco Cervelli and Michael Morse of hits. Tyler Lyons, filling in for the injured Carlos Martínez, completed seven scoreless innings with just four hits and no walks allowed.  Carpenter doubled and tripled, and Peralta added three RBI.  Seigrist, making his major league-leading 80th appearance of the season, became just the third left-handed pitcher in franchise history to make that many appearances in a season.

The Cardinals finished their regular season October 1–3 against the Atlanta Braves at Turner Field, which the Braves swept.  They held the Cardinals scoreless in their final 27 innings of the regular season.

Schedule and results

Game log

|- bgcolor=#ccffcc
| 1 || April 5 || @ Cubs || 3–0 || Wainwright (1–0) || Lester (0–1) || Rosenthal (1) || 35,055 || 1–0 || 1–0
|- bgcolor=#bbbbbb
| – || April 7 || @ Cubs || colspan="7" | Postponed (inclement weather) (Makeup date: July 7th)
|- bgcolor=#ffbbbb
| 2 || April 8 || @ Cubs || 0–2 || Arrieta (1-0) || Lynn (0-1) || Rondón (1) || 26,814 || 1–1 ||1–1
|- bgcolor=#ffbbbb
| 3 || April 10 || @ Reds || 4–5 || Hoover (2-0) || Walden (0-1) || Chapman (2) || 30,808 || 1–2 || 1–2
|- bgcolor=#ccffcc
| 4 || April 11 || @ Reds || 4–1 || Wacha (1-0) || Cueto (0-1) || Rosenthal (2) || 41,525 || 2–2 || 2–2
|- bgcolor=#ccffcc
| 5 || April 12 || @ Reds || 7–5 (11) || Villanueva (1-0) || Gregg (0-1) || – || 41,446 || 3–2 || 3–2
|- bgcolor=#ffbbbb
| 6 || April 13 || Brewers || 4–5 || Garza (1-1) || Wainwright (1-1) || Rodríguez (1) || 47,875 || 3–3 || 3–3
|- bgcolor=#ccffcc
| 7 || April 15 || Brewers || 4–2 || Lynn (1-1) || Peralta (0-1) || Rosenthal (3) || 40,826 || 4–3 || 4–3
|- bgcolor=#ccffcc
| 8 || April 16 || Brewers || 4–0 || Lackey (1-0) || Fiers (0-2) || – || 40,079 || 5–3 || 5–3
|- bgcolor=#ccffcc 
| 9 || April 17 || Reds || 6–1 || Wacha (2-0) || Cueto (0-2) || Siegrist (1) || 46,462 || 6–3 || 6–3
|- bgcolor=#ccffcc
| 10 || April 18 || Reds || 5–2 || Martínez (1-0) || Bailey (0-1) || Rosenthal (4) || 45,906 || 7–3 || 7–3
|- bgcolor=#ccffcc
| 11 || April 19 || Reds || 2–1 || Wainwright (2–1) || Leake (0–1) || Walden (1) || 40,742 || 8–3 || 7–3
|- bgcolor=#ffbbbb
| 12 || April 21 || @ Nationals || 1–2 (10) || Barrett (2-0) || Villanueva (1-1) || – || 27,021 || 8–4 || 7–3
|- bgcolor=#ccffcc
| 13 || April 22 || @ Nationals || 7–5 || Siegrist (1-0) || Treinen (0-2) || Rosenthal (5) || 25,771 || 9–4 || 8–2
|- bgcolor=#ccffcc
| 14 || April 23 || @ Nationals || 4–1 || Wacha (3-0) || Scherzer (1-2) || Rosenthal (6) || 26,990 || 10–4 || 8–2
|- bgcolor=#ccffcc
| 15 || April 24 || @ Brewers || 3–0 || Martínez (2-0) || Garza (1-3) || Rosenthal (7) || 26,286 || 11–4 || 8–2
|- bgcolor=#ccffcc
| 16 || April 25 || @ Brewers || 5–3 || Belisle (1-0) || Peralta (0-3) || Maness (1) || 35,919 || 12–4 || 9–1
|- bgcolor=#ffbbbb
| 17 || April 26 || @ Brewers || 3–6 || Blazek (1-0) || Lynn (1-2) || Rodríguez (3) || 32,758 || 12–5 || 8–2
|- bgcolor=#ffbbbb
| 18 || April 27 || Phillies || 1–4 || Hamels (1-2) || Lackey (1-1) || Papelbon (5) || 40,052 || 12–6 || 7–3
|- bgcolor=#ccffcc
| 19 || April 28 || Phillies || 11–5 || Wacha (4-0) || González (0-1) || – || 40,143 || 13–6 || 7–3
|- bgcolor=#ccffcc
| 20 || April 29 || Phillies || 5–2 || Martínez (3-0) || Harang (2-2) || Rosenthal (8) || 40,399 || 14–6 || 7–3
|- bgcolor=#ccffcc
| 21 || April 30 || Phillies || 9–3 || Villanueva (2-1) || Buchanan (0-5) || – || 40,715 || 15–6 || 7–3
|-

|- bgcolor=#ccffcc
| 22 || May 1 || Pirates || 2–1 (10) || Choate (1–0) || Scahill (0–2) || – || 40,912 || 16–6 || 7–3
|- bgcolor=#ccffcc
| 23 || May 2 || Pirates || 2–1 (11) || Villanueva (3-1) || Hughes (0-1) || – || 45,095 || 17–6 ||  8–2
|- bgcolor=#ccffcc
| 24 || May 3 || Pirates || 3–2 (14) || Socolovich (1-0) || Liz (1-2) || – || 44,382 || 18–6 || 8–2
|- bgcolor=#ccffcc
| 25 || May 4 || Cubs || 10–9 || Socolovich (2-0) || Strop (0-2) || Maness (2) || 41,981 || 19–6 || 8–2
|- bgcolor=#ccffcc
| 26 || May 5 || Cubs || 7–4 || Harris (1-0) || Jackson (1-1) || Rosenthal (9) || 41,613 || 20-6 || 8–2
|- bgcolor=#ffbbbb
| 27 || May 6 || Cubs || 5–6 || Lester (2-2) || Lynn (1-3) || Rondon (6) || 42,207 || 20–7 || 8–2 
|- bgcolor=#ccffcc
| 28 || May 7 || Cubs || 5–1 || Lackey (2-1) || Arrieta (3-3) || Rosenthal (10) || 44,472 || 21–7 || 9–1
|- bgcolor=#ccffcc
| 29 || May 8 || @ Pirates || 8–5 || Wacha (5-0) || Liriano (1-2) || Rosenthal (11) || 33,507 || 22–7 || 9–1
|- bgcolor=#ffbbbb
| 30 || May 9 || @ Pirates || 5–7 || Scahill (1-2) || Martínez (3-1) || Melancon (6) || 38,068 || 22–8 || 8–2
|- bgcolor=#ffbbbb
| 31 || May 10 || @ Pirates || 3–4 || Hughes (1-1) || Harris (1-1) || Melancon (7) || 34,036 || 22–9 || 7–3
|- bgcolor=#ccffcc
| 32 || May 12 || @ Indians || 8–3 || Lynn (2-3)  || Carrasco (4-3) || – || 12,615 || 23–9 || 7–3
|- bgcolor=#ffbbbb
| 33 || May 13 || @ Indians || 0–2 || Kluber (1-5) || Lackey (2-2) || Allen (5) || 12,313 || 23–10 || 6–4
|- bgcolor=#ccffcc
| 34 || May 14 || @ Indians || 2–1 || Siegrist (2-0) || Rzepczynski (1-1) || Rosenthal (12) || 15,865 || 24–10 || 6–4
|- bgcolor=#ffbbbb
| 35 || May 15 || Tigers || 4–10 || Greene (4-2) || Martinez (3-2) || – || 45,601 || 24–11 || 5–5
|- bgcolor=#ffbbbb
| 36 || May 16 || Tigers || 3–4 || Hardy (1-0) || Belisle (1-1) || Soria (12) || 45,313 || 24–12 || 4–6
|- bgcolor=#ccffcc
| 37 || May 17 || Tigers || 2–1 || Lynn (3-3) || Simón (4-2) || Rosenthal (13) || 43,654 || 25–12 || 5–5
|- bgcolor=#ffbbbb
| 38 || May 18 || @ Mets || 1–2 (14) || Torres (2-2) || Tuivailala (0-1) || – || 23,338 || 25–13 || 4–6
|- bgcolor=#ccffcc
| 39 || May 19 || @ Mets || 10–2 || Wacha (6-0) || Niese (3-4) || – || 21,157 || 26–13 || 4–6
|- bgcolor=#ccffcc
| 40 || May 20 || @ Mets || 9–0 || Martínez (4-2) || Colón (6-3) || – || 23,726 || 27–13 || 5–5
|- bgcolor=#ffbbbb
| 41 || May 21 || @ Mets || 0–5 || deGrom (5-4) || García (0-1) || – || 32,783 || 27–14 || 5–5
|- bgcolor=#ffbbbb
| 42 || May 22 || @ Royals || 0–5 || Young (4-0) || Lynn (3-4) || – || 37,379 || 27–15 || 4–6
|- bgcolor=#ffbbbb
| 43 || May 23 || @ Royals || 2–3 (6) || Vólquez (4-3) || Lackey (2-3) || – || 38,676 || 27–16 || 4–6
|- bgcolor=#ccffcc
| 44 || May 24 || @ Royals || 6–1 || Wacha (7-0) || Ventura (3-4) || – || 36,342 || 28–16 || 4–6
|- bgcolor=#ccffcc
| 45 || May 25 || Diamondbacks || 3–2 (10) || Rosenthal (1-0) || Ramirez (1-1) || – || 42,853 || 29–16 || 5–5
|- bgcolor=#ccffcc
| 46 || May 26 || Diamondbacks || 6–4 || García (1-1) || Bradley (2-2) || Maness (3) || 41,107 || 30–16 || 6–4
|- bgcolor=#ccffcc
| 47 || May 27 || Diamondbacks || 4–3 || Maness (1-0) || Ziegler (0-1) || – || 43,715 || 31–16 || 6–4
|- bgcolor=#ccffcc
| 48 || May 29 || Dodgers || 3–0 || Lackey (3-3) || Bolsinger (3-1) || Rosenthal (14) || 44,223 || 32–16 || 7–3
|- bgcolor=#ffbbbb
| 49 || May 30 || Dodgers || 1–5 || Frías (4-2) || Wacha (7-1) || – || 44,754 || 32–17 || 6–4
|- bgcolor=#ccffcc
| 50 || May 31 || Dodgers || 3–1 || Martínez (5-2) || Anderson (2-3) || Rosenthal (15) || 45,285 || 33–17 || 6–4
|-

|- bgcolor=#ffbbbb
| 51 || June 1 || Brewers || 0–1 || Fiers (2-5) || García (1-2) || Rodríguez (9) || 40,689 || 33–18 || 6–4
|- bgcolor=#ccffcc
| 52 || June 2 || Brewers || 1–0 || Lynn (4-4) || Cravy (0-1) || Rosenthal (16) || 42,835 || 34–18 || 6–4
|- bgcolor=#ccffcc
| 53 || June 3 || Brewers || 7–4 || Lackey (4-3) || Nelson (2-6) || Rosenthal (17) || 41,567 || 35–18 || 7–3
|- bgcolor=#ccffcc
| 54 || June 4 || @ Dodgers || 7–1 || Wacha (8–1) || Frías (4–3) || – || 45,058 || 36–18 || 8–2
|- bgcolor=#ccffcc
| 55 || June 5 || @ Dodgers || 2–1 || Martínez (6-2) || Anderson (2-4) || Rosenthal (18) || 44,649 || 37–18 || 8–2
|- bgcolor=#ffbbbb
| 56 || June 6 || @ Dodgers || 2–0|| Kershaw (5-3) ||  García (1-3)  || Jansen (6) || 47,655 || 37-19 || 7–3
|- bgcolor=#ccffcc
| 57 || June 7 || @ Dodgers || 4–2 ||Siegrist (3–0) || Nicasio (1–2) || Rosenthal (19) || 41,500 || 38-19 || 7–3
|- bgcolor=#ffbbbb
| 58 || June 8 || @ Rockies ||3–11 || Hale (2–0) || Lackey (4–4) || – || 32,043 || 38-20 || 6–4
|- bgcolor=#ffbbbb
| 59 || June 9 || @ Rockies || 4–3 || de la Rosa (3–2) || Wacha (8–2) || Axford (11) || 33,731 || 38–21 || 6–4
|- bgcolor=#ccffcc
| 60 || June 10 || @ Rockies || 4–2 || Martínez (7-2) || Bettis (2-1) || Rosenthal (20) || 30,698 || 39–21 || 6–4
|- bgcolor=#ccffcc
| 61 || June 12 || Royals || 4–0 || García (2-3) || Ventura (3–6) || – || 45,909 || 40–21 || 7–3
|- bgcolor=#ccffcc
| 62 || June 13 || Royals || 3–2 || Lyons (1–0) || Guthrie (4–4) || Rosenthal (21) || 45,981 || 41–21 || 7–3
|- bgcolor=#bbbbbb
| -- || June 14 || Royals || colspan="7" | Postponed (inclement weather) (Makeup date: July 23)
|- bgcolor=#ccffcc
| 63 || June 15 || Twins || 3–2 || Lackey (5–4) || May (4–5) || Siegrist (2) || 43,174 || 42–21 || 7–3
|- bgcolor=#ccffcc
| 64 || June 16 || Twins || 3–2 || Wacha (9–2) || Gibson (4–5) || Siegrist (3) || 41,203 || 43–21 || 7–3
|- bgcolor=#ffbbbb
| 65 || June 17 || @ Twins || 1–3 || Milone (3-1) || Martínez (7-3) || Perkins (23) || 34,381 || 43–22 || 6–4
|- bgcolor=#ffbbbb
| 66 || June 18 || @ Twins || 1–2 || Boyer (2-2) || Villanueva (3-2) || – || 34,648 || 43–23 || 6–4
|- bgcolor=#ccffcc
| 67 || June 19 || @ Phillies || 12–4 || Lyons (2–0) || Aumont (0–1) || – || 21,169 || 44–23 || 6–4
|- bgcolor=#ccffcc
| 68 || June 20 || @ Phillies || 10–1 || Lackey (6–4) || Harang (4–9) || – || 24,256 || 45–23 || 7–3
|- bgcolor=#ffbbbb
| 69 || June 21 || @ Phillies || 2–9 || Morgan (1–0) || Wacha (9–3) || – || 30,423 || 45–24 || 7–3
|- bgcolor=#ccffcc
| 70 || June 23 || @ Marlins || 4–3 || Martínez (8–3) || Dyson (3–3) || Rosenthal (22) || 21,759 || 46–24 || 7–3
|- bgcolor=#ccffcc
| 71 || June 24 || @ Marlins || 6–1 || García (3-3) || Latos (2-5) || – || 18,492 || 47–24 || 7–3
|- bgcolor=#ccffcc
| 72 || June 25 || @ Marlins || 5–1 || Lynn (5-4) || Haren (6-5) || – || 20,733 || 48–24 || 7–3
|- bgcolor=#ccffcc
| 73 || June 26 || Cubs || 3–2  (10)  || Maness (2-0) || Grimm (1-2) || – || 45,558 || 49–24 || 7–3 
|- bgcolor=#ccffcc
| 74 || June 27 || Cubs || 8–1 || Wacha (10-3) || Roach (0-1) || Villanueva (1) || 46,407 || 50–24 || 7–3
|- bgcolor=#ccffcc
| 75 || June 28 || Cubs || 4–1 || Martínez (9-3) || Hammel (5-3) || Rosenthal (23) || 45,384 || 51–24 || 8–2
|- bgcolor=#ffbbbb
| 76 || June 30 || White Sox || 1–2  (11)  || Webb (1-0) || Socolovich (2-1) || Robertson (16) || 45,626 || 51–25 || 8–2
|-

|- bgcolor=#ffbbbb
| 77 || July 1 || White Sox || 1–7 || Quintana (4–7) || Lackey (6–5) || – || 41,696 || 51–26 || 8–2
|- bgcolor=#ffbbbb 
| 78 || July 2 || Padres || 3–5  (11)  || Kelley (1–2) || Villanueva (3–3) || Kimbrel (20) || 42,926 || 51–27 || 7–3
|- bgcolor=#ffbbbb
| 79 || July 3 || Padres || 1–2 || Benoit (5–3) || Rosenthal (1–1) || Kimbrel (21) || 47,330 || 51–28 || 6–4
|- bgcolor=#ccffcc
| 80 || July 4 || Padres || 2–1 || Maness (3–0) || Maurer (5–1) || Rosenthal (24) || 44,690 || 52–28 || 6–4
|- bgcolor=#ccffcc
| 81 || July 5 || Padres || 3–1 || Lynn (6–4) || Kennedy (4–8) || Siegrist (4) || 42,764 || 53–28 || 6–4
|- bgcolor=#ccffcc
| 82 || July 6 || @ Cubs || 6–0 || Lackey (7–5) || Lester (4–7) || – || 37,609 || 54–28 || 6–4
|- bgcolor=#ffbbbb
| 83 || rowspan=2| July 7 || @ Cubs || 4–7 || Arrieta (9–5) || Lyons (2–1) || – || 34,368 || 54–29 || 5–5
|- bgcolor=#ffbbbb
| 84 || @ Cubs || 3–5 || Wood (5–3) || Maness (3–1) || Motte (5) || 35,703 || 54–30 || 4–6
|- bgcolor=#ccffcc
| 85 || July 8 || @ Cubs || 6–5 || Socolovich (3–1) || Strop (1–4) || Rosenthal (25) || 37,993 || 55–30 || 4–6
|- bgcolor=#ccffcc
| 86 || July 9 || @ Pirates || 4–1 || Martínez (10–3) || Locke (5–5) || Rosenthal (26) || 35,183 || 56–30 || 5–5
|- bgcolor=#ffbbbb
| 87 || July 10 ||@ Pirates || 2–5 || Cole (13–3) || Lynn (6–5) || Melancon (29) || 36,825 || 56–31 || 5–5
|- bgcolor=#ffbbbb
| 88 || July 11 ||@ Pirates || 5–6 (14) || Worley (3–4) || Greenwood (0–1) || – || 37,318 || 56–32 || 5–5
|- bgcolor=#ffbbbb
| 89 || July 12 || @ Pirates || 5–6 (10) || Caminero (1–1) || Rosenthal (1–2) || – || 33,544 || 56–33 || 5–5
|- style="text-align:center; bgcolor="bbcaff"
| rowspan=3 |ASG || colspan=8 | 86th All-Star Game at Great American Ball Park in Cincinnati, Ohio, United States || rowspan=3 |Box
|- bgcolor="bbcaff"
| July 14 || colspan=2 | American 6, National 3 || Price (AL, DET) || Kershaw (NL, LAD) || – || 43,656 || 43−41–2  
|- style="text-align:center; bgcolor="bbcaff"
| colspan=8 |Representing the Cardinals: Holliday, Martínez, Molina, Peralta, Rosenthal, and Wacha
|- bgcolor=#ccffcc
| 90 || July 17 || Mets || 3–2 || Lynn (7–5) || Syndergaard (4–5) || Rosenthal (27) || 44,540 || 57–33 || 5–5
|- bgcolor=#ccffcc
| 91 || July 18 || Mets || 12–2 || Lackey (8–5) || Colón (9–8) || – || 45,852 || 58–33 || 5–5
|- bgcolor=#ffbbbb
| 92 || July 19 || Mets || 1–3 (18) || Torres (3–4) || Martínez (10–4) || – || 43,194 || 58–34 || 4–6
|- bgcolor=#ccffcc
| 93 || July 21 || @ White Sox || 8–5 || Wacha (11–3) || Rodon (3–3) || Rosenthal (28) || 29,728 || 59–34 || 5–5
|- bgcolor=#ccffcc
| 94 || July 22 || @ White Sox || 3–2 || Socolovich (4–1) || Duke (3–4) || Rosenthal (29) || 30,046 || 60–34 || 6–4
|- bgcolor=#ccffcc
| 95 || July 23 || Royals || 4–3 || Lackey (9–5) || Young (8–6) || Rosenthal (30) || 46,003 || 61–34 || 6–4
|- bgcolor=#ccffcc
| 96 || July 24 || Braves || 4–2 || Cooney (1–0) || Banuelos (1–2) || Siegrist (5) || 44,778 || 62–34 || 6–4
|- bgcolor=#ccffcc
| 97 || July 25 || Braves || 1–0 || Martínez (11–4) || Miller (5–7) || Choate (1) || 45,862 || 63–34 || 7–3
|- bgcolor=#ffbbbb
| 98 || July 26 || Braves || 2–3 || Wisler (5–1) || Wacha (11–4) || Johnson (9) || 44,870 || 63–35 || 7–3
|- bgcolor=#ccffcc
| 99 || July 27 || Reds || 4–1 || Lynn (8–5)  || Iglesias (1–3)  || Rosenthal (31)  || 42,553 || 64–35 || 8–2
|- bgcolor=#ffbbbb
| 100 || July 28 || Reds || 0–4 || Leake (9–5) || García (3–4) || – || 41,466 || 64–36 ||7–3
|- bgcolor=#ffbbbb
| 101 || July 29 || Reds || 1–11 || DeSclafani (6–7) || Lackey (9–6) || Chapman (21) || 42,334 || 64–37 ||6–4
|- bgcolor=#ccffcc
| 102 || July 30 || Rockies || 9–8 || Villanueva (4–3) || Axford (3–4) || – || 43,518 || 65-37 ||7–3
|- bgcolor=#ccffcc
| 103 || July 31 || Rockies || 7–0 || Wacha (12-4) || Kendrick (4-12) || – || 42,568 || 66–37 || 7–3
|-

|- bgcolor=#ffbbbb
| 104 || August 1 || Rockies || 2–6 || de la Rosa (7–4) || Lynn (8–6) || – || 45,216 || 66–38 || 6–4
|- bgcolor=#ccffcc
| 105 || August 2 || Rockies || 3–2 || Rosenthal (2–2) || Oberg (2–2) || – || 44,743 || 67–38 || 6–4
|- bgcolor=#ffbbbb
| 106 || August 4 || @ Reds || 2–3 || DeSclafani (7–7) || Lackey (9–7) || Chapman (23) || 25,969 || 67–39 || 5–5
|- bgcolor=#ccffcc
| 107 || August 5 || @ Reds || 4–3 (13) || Maness (4–1) || Axelrod (0–1) || – || 34,700 || 68–39 || 5–5 
|- bgcolor=#ccffcc
| 108 || August 6 || @ Reds || 3–0 || Wacha (13–4) || Lorenzen (3–7) || Rosenthal (32) || 26,053 || 69–39 || 6–4
|- bgcolor=#ccffcc
| 109 || August 7 || @ Brewers || 6–0 || Lynn (9–6) || Cravy (0–3) || Villanueva (2) || 28,869 || 70–39 || 6–4
|- bgcolor=#ccffcc
| 110 || August 8 || @ Brewers || 3–0 || García (4–4) || Peralta (2–7) || Rosenthal (33) || 34,327 || 71–39 || 7–3
|- bgcolor=#ffbbbb
| 111 || August 9 || @ Brewers || 4–5 || Smith (2–2)  || Broxton (1–3) || Rodríguez (26) || 34,993 || 71–40 || 7–3
|- bgcolor=#ccffcc
| 112 || August 11 || Pirates || 4–3 || Martínez (12–4) || Locke (6–7) || Rosenthal (34) || 41,273 || 72–40 || 7–3
|- bgcolor=#ccffcc
| 113 || August 12 || Pirates || 4–2 || Wacha (14–4) || Cole (14–6) || Rosenthal (35) || 41,493 || 73–40 || 7–3
|- bgcolor=#ffbbbb
| 114 || August 13 || Pirates || 5–10 || Liriano (8–6) || Lynn (9–7) || – || 41,501 || 73–41 || 7–3
|- bgcolor=#ccffcc
| 115 || August 14 || Marlins || 3–1 || García (5–4) || Koehler (8–10) || Rosenthal (36) || 42,025 || 74–41 || 7–3
|- bgcolor=#ccffcc
| 116 || August 15 || Marlins || 6–2 || Lackey (10–7) || Hand (2–3) || – || 44,706 || 75–41 || 8–2
|- bgcolor=#ffbbbb
| 117 || August 16 || Marlins || 6–14 || Narveson (1–0)  || Martínez (12–5) || Ramos (19) || 43,826 || 75–42 || 7–3
|- bgcolor=#ccffcc
| 118 || August 17 || Giants || 2–1 || Siegrist (4–0) || Strickland (2–2) || Rosenthal (37) || 40,088 || 76–42 ||7–3
|- bgcolor=#ffbbbb
| 119 || August 18 || Giants || 2–10 || Vogelsong (9–8) || Lynn (9–8) || Casilla (29) || 40,297 || 76–43 ||6–4
|- bgcolor=#ccffcc
| 120 || August 19 || Giants || 4–3 || Siegrist (5–0) || Strickland (2–3) || Rosenthal (38) || 40,278 || 77–43 ||6–4
|- bgcolor=#ffbbbb
| 121 || August 21 || @ Padres || 3–9 || Cashner (5–12) || Lackey (10–8) || – || 32,734 || 77–44 ||6–4
|- bgcolor=#ffbbbb
| 122 || August 22 || @ Padres || 0–8 || Kennedy (8–11) || Martínez (12–6) || – || 44,816 || 77–45 ||5–5
|- bgcolor=#ccffcc
| 123 || August 23 || @ Padres || 10–3 || Wacha (15–4) || Rea (2–1) || – || 33,756 || 78–45 || 5–5
|- bgcolor=#ccffcc
| 124 || August 24 || @ D-backs || 5–3 || Lynn (10–8) || Chacín (0–1) || Rosenthal (39) || 19,892 || 79–45 || 6–4
|- bgcolor=#ccffcc
| 125 || August 25 || @ D-backs || 9–1 || García (6–4) || Ray (3–10) || – || 18,720 || 80–45 || 6–4
|- bgcolor=#ccffcc
| 126 || August 26 || @ D-backs || 3–1 || Lackey (11–8) || Hernandez (1–4) || Rosenthal (40) || 17,572 || 81–45 || 6–4
|- bgcolor=#ccffcc
| 127 || August 27 || @ D-backs || 5–3 || Martínez (13–6) || De La Rosa (11–6) || Rosenthal (41) || 22,036 || 82–45 || 7–3
|- bgcolor=#ffbbbb
| 128 || August 28 || @ Giants || 4–5 || López (1–0) || Siegrist (5–1) || – || 41,577 || 82–46 || 7–3
|- bgcolor=#ccffcc
| 129 || August 29 || @ Giants || 6–0 || Lynn (11–8) || Vogelsong (9–10) || – || 41,796 || 83–46 || 7–3
|- bgcolor=#ccffcc
| 130 || August 30 || @ Giants || 7–5 || García (7–4) || Heston (11–8) || Siegrist (6) || 41,770 || 84–46 || 7–3
|- bgcolor=#ccffcc
| 131 || August 31 || Nationals || 8–5 || Siegrist (6–1) || Janssen (1–3) || Rosenthal (42) || 42,081 || 85–46 || 8–2
|-

|- bgcolor=#ccffcc
| 132 || September 1 || Nationals || 8–5 || Harris (2–1) || Janssen (1–4) || || 42,589 || 86–46 || 9–1
|- bgcolor=#ffbbbb
| 133 || September 2 || Nationals || 3–4 || Martin (1–0) || Broxton (1–4) || Papelbon (23) || 41,489 || 86–47 || 8–2
|- bgcolor=#ffbbbb
| 134 || September 4 || Pirates || 3–9 || Happ (8–7) || Martínez (13–7) || – || 44,338 || 86–48 || 7–3
|- bgcolor=#ccffcc
| 135 || September 5 || Pirates || 4–1 || García (8–4) || Morton (8–7) || – || 45,139 || 87–48 || 7–3
|- bgcolor=#ffbbbb
| 136 || September 6 || Pirates || 1–7 || Cole (16–8) || Lackey (11–9) || – || 46,011 || 87–49 || 6–4
|- bgcolor=#ffbbbb
| 137 || September 7 || Cubs || 0–9 || Haren (9–9)  || Lynn (11–9) || – || 45,986 || 87–50 || 5–5
|- bgcolor=#ffbbbb
| 138 || September 8 || Cubs || 5–8 || Hammel (8–6) || Wacha (15–5) || Rondon (27) || 42,206 || 87–51 || 5–5
|- bgcolor=#ccffcc
| 139 || September 9 || Cubs || 4–3 || Broxton (2–4) || Richard (3–1) || Rosenthal (43) || 43,557 || 88–51 || 5–5
|- bgcolor=#ffbbbb
| 140 || September 10 || @ Reds || 11–12 || Lamb (1–3) || García (8–5) || – || 16,363 || 88–52 || 4–6
|- bgcolor=#ffbbbb
| 141 || September 11 || @ Reds || 2–4|| Hoover (8–1) || Broxton (2–5) || Chapman (30) || 31,427 || 88–53 || 3–7
|- bgcolor=#ffbbbb
| 142 || September 12 || @ Reds || 1–5 || DeSclafani (9–10) || Lynn (11–10) || – || 41,137 || 88–54 || 2–8
|- bgcolor=#ccffcc
| 143 || September 13 || @ Reds || 9–2 || Wacha (16–5) || LeCure (0–1)  || – || 29,900 || 89–54 || 3–7 
|- bgcolor=#ccffcc
| 144 || September 15 || @ Brewers || 3–1 (10) || Siegrist (7–1) || Thornburg (0–2)  ||Rosenthal (44) || 30,349 || 90–54 || 4–6
|- bgcolor=#ccffcc
| 145 || September 16 || @ Brewers || 5–4 || García (9–5) || Peralta (5–9) || Rosenthal (45) || 19,827 || 91–54 || 4–6
|- bgcolor=#ccffcc
| 146 || September 17 || @ Brewers || 6–3 || Lackey (12–9) || Nelson (11–13) || – || 23,734 || 92–54 || 5–5
|- bgcolor=#ffbbbb
| 147 || September 18 || @ Cubs || 3–8 || Hunter (4–2) || Maness (4–2) || – || 40,846 || 92–55 || 5–5
|- bgcolor=#ffbbbb
| 148 || September 19 || @ Cubs || 4–5 || Cahill (1–3) || Wacha (16–6) || Strop (3) || 40,994 || 92–56 || 5–5
|- bgcolor=#ccffcc
| 149 || September 20 || @ Cubs || 4–3 || Martínez (14–7) || Lester (10–11) || Rosenthal (46) || 40,962 || 93–56 || 5–5
|- bgcolor=#ccffcc
| 150 || September 21 || Reds || 2–1 || Broxton (3–5) || Hoover (8–2) || Rosenthal (47) || 43,902 || 94–56 || 6–4 
|- bgcolor=#ccffcc
| 151 || September 22 || Reds || 3–1 || Lackey (13–9) || LeCure (0–2) || Cishek (4) || 43,981 || 95–56 || 7–3 
|- bgcolor=#ccffcc
| 152 || September 23 || Reds || 10–2 || Lynn (12–10) || Finnegan (4–1) || – || 43,729 || 96–56 || 8–2
|- bgcolor=#ccffcc
| 153 || September 24 || Brewers || 7–3 || Wacha (17–6) || Jungmann (9–7)  || – || 43,243 || 97–56 || 8–2 
|- bgcolor=#ffbbbb
| 154 || September 25 || Brewers || 3–4 || Smith (7–2) || Rosenthal (2–3) || – || 45.057 || 97–57 || 7–3
|- bgcolor=#ccffcc
| 155 || September 26 || Brewers || 5–1 || García (10–5) || Wagner (0–1) || – || 45,561 || 98–57 || 7–3
|- bgcolor=#ffbbbb
| 156 || September 27 || Brewers || 4–8 || Goforth (1–0)  || Rosenthal (2–4) || Rodríguez (37) || 45,021 || 98–58 ||6–4
|- bgcolor=#ccffcc
| 157 || September 28 || @ Pirates || 3–0 || Broxton (4–5) || Melancon (3–2) || Rosenthal (48) || 30,198 || 99–58 ||7–3
|- bgcolor=#bbbbbb
| － || September 29 || @ Pirates ||colspan="7" | Postponed (rain). Makeup date: September 30.
|- bgcolor=#ffbbbb
| 158 || September 30 || @ Pirates || 2–8 || Cole (19–8) || Wacha (17–7) || – || 29,747 || 99–59 ||7–3
|- bgcolor=#ccffcc
| 159 || September 30 || @ Pirates || 11–1 || Lyons (3–1) || Morton (9–9) || – || 34,729 || 100–59 ||7–3
|-

|- bgcolor=#ffbbbb
| 160 || October 2 || @ Braves ||0–4||Teherán (11–8)|| García (10–6) || – || 24,481 || 100–60 ||6–4
|- bgcolor=#bbbbbb
| – || October 3 || @ Braves || colspan=7| Postponed (rain).  Makeup date: October 4.
|- bgcolor=#ffbbbb
| 161 ||  rowspan=2|October 4|| @ Braves || 0–6 ||Miller (6–17)||Lackey (13–10)  || – || 31,441 || 100–61 || 5–5
|- bgcolor=#ffbbbb
| 162 ||@ Braves || 0–2 || Wisler (8–8) || Lynn (12–11) || Jackson (1) ||31,441|| 100–62 ||4–6
|-

|-
| Legend:       = Win       = Loss       = PostponementBold = Cardinals team member

Roster

Injury report

In-season acquisitions and roster moves

Postseason

Game log

|-  bgcolor="ffbbbb"
|- align="center" bgcolor=#ccffcc
| 1 || October 9 || Cubs || 4–0 || Lackey (1–0)   || Lester (0–1) || – || 47,830 || 1–0
|- align="center" bgcolor=#ffbbbb 
| 2 || October 10 || Cubs || 3–6 || Wood (1–0) || García (0–1) || Rondón (1) || 47,859 || 1–1 
|- align="center" bgcolor=#ffbbbb 
| 3 || October 12||  @ Cubs || 6–8 || Arrieta (2–0) || Wacha (0–1) || – || 42,411 || 1–2 
|- align="center" bgcolor=#ffbbbb 
| 4 || October 13 || @ Cubs || 4–6 || Cahill (1–0) || Siegrist (0–1) || Rondón (2) || 42,411 || 1–3
|-

|-
| Legend:       = Win       = Loss       = PostponementBold = Cardinals team member

National League Division Series

The Cardinals faced off in a best-of-five series against the rival Chicago Cubs in the postseason for the first time since joining the National League in 1892.  The first two games took place at the Cardinals' home venue, Busch Stadium. John Lackey started Game 1 for the Cardinals, opposing Jon Lester, who had both faced St. Louis in the 2013 World Series as members of the Boston Red Sox.  Lackey held the Cubs to hitless through the first five innings on the way to pitching  shutout innings in a 4–0 win.  Rookies Stephen Piscotty and Tommy Pham both hit their first career postseason home runs. Jaime García, the starter for Game 2, pitched with illness and was ineffective, allowing five unearned runs in just two innings.  Two errors, including his own, allowed the Cubs to take an early 5–1 lead.  The Cardinals scored all runs on solo home runs from Matt Carpenter, Kolten Wong, and Randal Grichuk.

The series shifted to Wrigley Field, the Cubs' home park, for the next two games.  In the third game, the Cubs hit six home runs, and led 8–4 going into the ninth.  After Piscotty's two-run home run, the Cardinals trailed by two, but this was the outcome as the Cubs won 8–6. The Cubs also won the final game, 6–4, to move on to the National League Championship Series and end the Cardinals' season. Anthony Rizzo hit his second home run in two days off reliever Kevin Siegrist for the go-ahead run.

Postseason rosters

| style="text-align:left" |
Pitchers: 30 Jonathan Broxton 31 Lance Lynn 33 Carlos Villanueva 41 John Lackey 44 Trevor Rosenthal 46 Kevin Siegrist 50 Adam Wainwright 52 Michael Wacha 54 Jaime García 61 Seth Maness 70 Tyler Lyons
Catchers: 4 Yadier Molina 48 Tony Cruz 
Infielders: 12 Mark Reynolds 13 Matt Carpenter 16 Kolten Wong 21 Brandon Moss 27 Jhonny Peralta 35 Greg Garcia 
Outfielders: 7 Matt Holliday 15 Randal Grichuk 19 Jon Jay 22 Jason Heyward 55 Stephen Piscotty 60 Tommy Pham
|- valign="top"

Statistics

Batting statistics

Pitching statistics

Records, awards, honors and milestones

Major League Baseball All-Star Game selections

Awards

Awards voting results: National League Most Valuable Player Award: Carpenter, 12th; Heyward, 15th; Rosenthal 17th. National League Cy Young Award: Lackey, 9th. National League Rookie of the Year Award: Piscotty, 6th. National League Manager of the Year Award: Matheny, 2nd.

Milestones

Executives and club officials
Source: Cardinals front office
Executive officers
Chairman and chief executive officer: William DeWitt, Jr.
 President: William DeWitt III
 Senior vice president & general counsel: Mike Whittle
 Vice president of business development: Dan Good
Baseball operations department
 Senior vice president of baseball operations / general manager (GM): John Mozeliak
 Assistant general manager:  Mike Girsch
 Special assistants to the GM: Ryan Franklin, Mike Jorgensen, Cal Eldred, Willie McGee, and Red Schoendienst
 Director of player development: Gary LaRocque
 Director of player personnel: Matt Slater
 Director of Major League administration: Judy Carpenter-Barada
 Director of baseball administration:  John Vuch
 Baseball operations coordinator for player development: Tony Ferreira
 Director of scouting: Randy Flores
 Director of international operations:  Moisés Rodríguez
 Assistant director of international scouting: Luís Morales
 Manager for baseball information:  Jeremy Cohen
 Baseball development analysts:  Matt Bayer, Kevin Seats, Dane Sorensen
 Baseball developers:  Pat Casanta, Brian Seyfert
 Additional coaching staff
 Senior medical advisor:  Barry Weinberg
 Head athletic trainer: Greg Hauck
 Strength/conditioning coach: Pete Prinzi
 Equipment manager: Rip Rowan
 Traveling secretary: C. J. Cherre
Communications department
 Vice president:  Ron Watermon 
 Director:  Brian Bartow
Cardinals Care and community relations department
 Vice president for community relations & executive director for Cardinals Care: Michael Hall
 Vice president for event services and merchandising:  Vicki Bryant
Finance and administration department
 Senior vice president and chief financial officer:  Brad Wood
Operations department
 Vice president:  Joe Abernathy
Ticket sales, marketing & corporate sales department
 Senior vice president of sales & marketing:  Dan Farrell

Minor league system and first-year player draft

Teams

‡ – Clinched playoff berth with 43–25 record and first place in second half
¤ – Clinched playoff spot
ƒ – Clinched division title

Overview
Left-handed starting pitcher Tim Cooney, playing for the Memphis Redbirds of the Pacific Coast League (PCL), was named the PCL Pitcher of the Week after allowing a 0.66 ERA in  IP against the New Orleans Zephyrs and Omaha Storm Chasers.  He also held batters to a .143 batting average against (7-for-49). For the week ending June 7, Tyler Lyons, also a left-handed starter playing for Memphis, was named PCL Pitcher of the week after defeating both the Salt Lake Bees and Iowa Cubs.  He allowed a 0.00 ERA, 0.54 WHIP and .136 batting average against while striking out 13 in 13 IP.

Right-handed pitcher Alex Reyes was selected to represent the World team in the All-Star Futures Game.  Just coming off a 13-strikeout performance on June 17 with the Class A Advanced Palm Beach Cardinals, he led all of the minor leagues with a 13.4 strikeouts per nine innings.  For the season, he was 2–5 with a 2.08 ERA, while striking 90 and walking 30 in  IP.  Reyes' fastball could reach  and he also threw a power curveball. Luís Perdomo, pitching for the Peoria Chiefs of the Midwest League, replaced Reyes in the Futures Game due to injury.  Converted from playing outfield after a major league tryout in front of scouts, he totaled 13 starts, a 2.79 ERA, 76 BB and 26 BB in  IP. Jim Callis ranked Reyes as the Cardinals' top prospect for 2015, and the best prospect not to make MLB.com's top 100 list of all professional baseball.

On July 2, reports emerged that the Cardinals had signed five international free agents, including Noel De Jesús (RHP from the Dominican Republic), Raffy Ozuna (shortstop, Dominican Republic), Brian Pirela (RHP, Venezuela), Álvaro Seijas (RHP, Venezuela), and Anthony Trompiz (RHP, Venezuela).  At the time, Seijas, 16, was the 11th-ranked international prospect per MLB.com's top 30 list, and received a $762,500 signing bonus.  Ozuna, also 16, received a $600,000 signing bonus.

While carrying out a rehabilitation assignment with the Peoria Chiefs on July 23, RHP Jaime García pitched in a combined no-hitter and 2–0 win against the Clinton LumberKings, a Seattle Mariners affiliate.  The starter for the game, García pitched the first five innings and struck out six.  Steven Sabatino and Cody Schumacher finished the contest.

Awards
 MLB.com's Cardinals 2015 top 30 prospects list
 Names in bold denote player appeared on Cardinals' major league roster in 2015.
 † – both a midseason and postseason All-Star selection

All-Star (midseason) selections
 Major League Baseball All-Star Futures Game:
 Luís Perdomo (RHP, Peoria Chiefs) (replaced Reyes)
 Alex Reyes (RHP, Palm Beach Cardinals) (injured)

 Pacific Coast League (AAA): Box 
Tim Cooney (LHP)
Sam Tuivailala (RHP)

 Texas League (AA): Box
 Kyle Barraclough (RHP)
 Joey Donofrio (RHP)
 Jeremy Hazelbaker (RF)
 Michael Ohlman (C)†
 Arturo Reyes (RHP)† 
 Chris Thomas (RHP) 
 Charlie Tilson (CF)†

 Florida State League (A-Advanced): Box
 Bruce Caldwell (IF)
 Alex Reyes (RHP)
 Luke Voit (DH)

 Midwest League (A): Box
 Austin Gomber (LHP)†
 Oscar Mercado (SS)
 Daniel Poncedeleon (RHP)
 Luís Perdomo (RHP)

All-Star (postseason) selections

 Texas League (AA):
 Michael Ohlman (C)†
 Arturo Reyes (RHP)† 
 Charlie Tilson (CF)†

 Midwest League (A): 
 Austin Gomber (LHP)†
 Kyle Grana (RHP)
 Darren Seferina (2B)

Monthly awards
 Florida State League Player of the Month:
 July: Corey Littrell (LHP)
 Texas League Player of the Month:
 June: Patrick Wisdom (3B)
 Cardinals Minor League Pitcher of the Month:
 April: Alex Reyes (RHP), Palm Beach
 May: Luís Perdomo (RHP), Peoria 
 June: Arturo Reyes (RHP)†, Springfield 
 July: Luke Weaver (RHP), Palm Beach
 August: Austin Gomber, Peoria
 Cardinals Minor League Player of the Month:
 April: Xavier Scruggs (1B), Memphis
 May: Greg Garcia (IF)
 June: Patrick Wisdom (3B)
 July: Anthony Garcia (OF), Springfield

Weekly awards
 Pitcher of the Week:
 Will Anderson (RHP): May 4, Florida State League
Tim Cooney (RHP):  May 17, Pacific Coast League
 Thomas Lee (RHP) − 2×:  May 10 and June 7, Texas League
Tyler Lyons (LHP): June 7, Pacific Coast League
 Jimmy Reed (LHP): May 25, Florida State League
 Arturo Reyes (RHP)†:  June 7, Texas League
 Player of the Week:
 Harrison Bader (OF):  August 31, Midwest League
 Jeremy Hazelbaker (OF):  July 13, Pacific Coast League
 Michael Ohlman (C):  June 7, Texas League
 Nick Thompson (OF):  August 24, Midwest League
 Patrick Wisdom (3B): June 15, Texas League

Baseball America All-Star Awards
 Minor League Classification All-Star Teams
 High Class-A pitcher: Alex Reyes
 High Class-A pitcher: Luke Weaver 
 Short season Class-A pitcher:  Jacob Evans
 Rookie leagues pitcher:  Ryan Helsley

Baseball America Annual Toolbox Awards
Source:
 Pacific Coast League
 Best strike zone judgment: Greg Garcia (2B)
 Best control: Tim Cooney (LHP)
 Best reliever: Sam Tuivailala (RHP)
 Best defensive outfielder: Tommy Pham (CF)
 Texas League
 Best defensive first baseman: Jonathan Rodriguez (1B)
 Florida State League
 Best pitching prospect: Alex Reyes (RHP)
 Best fastball: Alex Reyes (RHP)
 Best breaking pitch: Alex Reyes (RHP)

Rawlings Gold Glove Award
 Rawlings Gold Glove Award for minor league catchers: Carson Kelly

St. Louis Cardinals minor league system awards
 Minor League Player of the Year: Stephen Piscotty (OF)
 Minor League Pitchers of the Year: Austin Gomber (LHP) & Alex Reyes (RHP)

Major League Baseball Draft

The Cardinals selected a total of 42 players in the annual 40-round draft that took place from June 8–10 in Secaucus, New Jersey.  The club's first pick of the draft, and 23rd overall, was outfielder Nick Plummer from Brother Rice High School in Michigan. He was the first high school player from Michigan taken in the first round since 1997.  The Cardinals acceded him with a $2.124 million signing bonus. The Cardinals also signed each of the following selectees of the first ten rounds: Jake Woodford (RHP, 1A), Jordan Hicks (RHP, third round), Paul DeJong (LF, fourth), Ryan Helsley, (RHP, fifth), Andrew Brodbeck, (2B ninth), and others in the later rounds.  Other selections notified the Cardinals of their intention to continue playing college baseball: Kép Brown (10th round), Gio Brusa (23rd), Matt Vierling (30th) and Parker Kelly (34th).

Names in bold indicate the player was signed.  Sources:

References
Footnotes

Source notes

External links
St. Louis Cardinals official site 
2015 St. Louis Cardinals at ESPN
2015 St. Louis Cardinals at Baseball Reference

St. Louis Cardinals seasons
St. Louis Cardinals
St. Louis Cardinals
National League Central champion seasons